During the 1994–95 English football season, Chelsea competed in the Premier League.

Season summary
It was another unsatisfying season for Chelsea, who failed to make much of an impact in the league but once again enjoyed a memorable cup run. They entered the Cup Winners' Cup after a 23-year exile from European competitions, and reached the semi-finals where they went out to a single Real Zaragoza goal, ending their hopes of an all-English final with Arsenal.

The summer of 1995 saw manager Glenn Hoddle bring in two of the most famous names in world football, Ruud Gullit and Mark Hughes. He also terminated the contract of misfit striker Robert Fleck as well as deciding to end his own playing career. The only other significant change to the squad was the sale of out-of-favour midfielder David Hopkin to Crystal Palace.

Final league table

Results summary

Results by round

Results
Chelsea's score comes first

Legend

FA Premier League

FA Cup

Third round

Fourth round

League Cup

Second round

Third round

Cup Winners' Cup

First round

Second round

Quarter-finals

Semi-finals

Squad

Left club during season

Reserve squad

Transfers

In

Out

Transfers in:  £4,325,000
Transfers out:  £1,250,000
Total spending:  £3,075,000

References

Chelsea F.C. seasons
Chelsea